Myracrodruon balansae is a species of flowering tree in the cashew family, Anacardiaceae, that is native to Argentina, Brazil and Paraguay.

References

Anacardiaceae
Plants described in 1881